El Pasajero Diez Mil is a 1946 Mexican comedy-drama film directed by Miguel Morayta and starring Rafael Baledón, Lilia Michel, and José Goula.

References

External links
 

1946 films
1940s Spanish-language films
1946 comedy-drama films
Mexican black-and-white films
Mexican comedy-drama films
1940s Mexican films